Stanley Obumneme Udenkwor (born 1 May 1981 in Awka-Etiti, Nigeria) is a Nigerian-born Polish former professional footballer.

Career
Udenkwor started his career off in his native Nigeria playing for Jasper United. In 2001, Udenkwor moved to Poland and signed with Polonia Warsaw. Udenkwor successfully applied for a Polish passport, and in turn became a citizen. He became the second African footballer to become a Polish citizen, the other being Emmanuel Olisadebe, who went on to feature for the Polish international team. Incidentally Olisadebe also started his career at Jasper United. His next football move was to sign for Okęcie Warsaw, before spending time in the Azerbaijan Premier League with Neftchi Baku. He then moved to England and joined Gainsborough Trinity, playing in the Conference North league. Udenkwor was firstly given a trial by the club's manager Paul Mitchell, and after scoring a hat-trick in his debut for the reserves, he was given a short-term contract.

His stay at Gainsborough was well covered in the local media, mainly down to the fact that while at Polonia Warsaw he featured in the UEFA Champions League, which was a notable achievement for any player playing at that level in the English game.

After only five games, including a 1-3 home defeat to Barnet in the first round of the FA Cup, Stanley was released by Trinity. He returned to Poland and signed for Podbeskidzie Bielsko-Biała, and later went on to play for Mazur Karczew before joining Chrobry Głogów.

References

External links
 

1981 births
Living people
Polish footballers
Polish expatriate footballers
Ekstraklasa players
Polonia Warsaw players
Gainsborough Trinity F.C. players
Association football forwards
Nigerian expatriate sportspeople in Azerbaijan
Nigerian expatriate footballers
Nigerian footballers
Naturalized citizens of Poland
Expatriate footballers in Azerbaijan
Sportspeople from Anambra State
Nigerian emigrants to Poland
Neftçi PFK players
Jasper United F.C. players